The Landsmannschaft Westpreußen ("Territorial Association of West Prussia", "Homeland Association of West Prussia") is an organization of Heimatvertriebene — Germans born in West Prussia, or their descendants, who either fled or were expelled to the Federal Republic of Germany during the Expulsion of Germans after World War II.

The organization was founded on 6 April 1949 and is based in Münster, North Rhine-Westphalia. Its current president is Mrs. Sibylle Dreher, and CDU politician Mrs. Erika Steinbach is a notable member. The Landsmannschaft is a member of the Federation of Expellees.

See also 
 Evacuation of East Prussia

External links 
 Landsmannschaft Westpreußen (official homepage)

Organizations established in 1949
Landsmannschaften
West Prussia
Münster
1949 establishments in West Germany